Gracy is a feminine given name and a spelling variant of  Gracie which itself is derived from  Grace. Unlike Gracie its usage is particularly limited to India.

People named Gracy:

Gracy Singh, Indian actress
Gracy Goswami, Indian child actress
Gracy (writer), Malayalam writer

See also
Gracie (disambiguation)
Gracey (disambiguation)